The Norway women's national under-17 football team represents Norway at the UEFA Women's Under-17 Championship and the FIFA U-17 Women's World Cup. The team has yet to qualify for the latter competition.

Tournament record

UEFA Women's Under-17 Championship

The Norwegian team has participated in five of the thirteen UEFA Women's Under-17 Championships to date. The best result was reaching the semi-final in 2017, where no third place play-off was held.

Players
The following 20 players were called up by head coach Elise Brotangen for the 2022 UEFA Women's Under-17 Championship in May 2022.

See also
 Norway women's national football team
 Norway women's national under-19 football team
 FIFA U-17 Women's World Cup
 UEFA Women's Under-17 Championship

References

External links
Official website at Norwegian Football Federation (in Norwegian)

Women's national under-17 association football teams
under
European women's national under-17 association football teams